Jiangxi Provincial Parliament was the highest legislature of Jiangxi between 1912 and 1924.

Jiangxi Provincial Parliament was created on 1 February 1912, based on Jiangxi Provincial Consultative Bureau (江西省諮議局). After 3 congresses held in 1912, 1918, 1921, the Parliament was dislocated owing to numerous wars during the Northern Expedition and other political reasons.

References
ZHOU Fangshang, Jiangxi Provincial Parliament of the Early period of ROC, 1989

Politics of the Republic of China (1912–1949)